Gaimardia setacea is a species of plant of the Restionaceae family. It is found in New Zealand (on the South Island and the Stewart Islands), New Guinea and Tasmania.

References

Restionaceae
Flora of New Zealand
Flora of New Guinea
Flora of Tasmania
Plants described in 1853
Taxa named by Joseph Dalton Hooker